Chenda is a 1973 Indian Malayalam-language film, directed and produced by A. Vincent. The film stars Madhu, Srividya, Sukumari, Sudheer and Kaviyoor Ponnamma. It was released on 27 April 1973.

Plot

Cast 

Madhu
Sreevidya
Sudheer
Sukumari
Kaviyoor Ponnamma
Adoor Bhasi
Thikkurissy Sukumaran Nair
Sankaradi
Bahadoor
Balan K. Nair
C. A. Balan
Kedamangalam Ali
Kunchan
Nanditha Bose
S. P. Pillai
Sathyapalan Nair
Thrithala Sreekumar
Subhadra
Kottarakkara Sreedharan Nair
 Dance: Mayuram Dance Sisters:
(Kumari Kamala, Kumari Radha, Kumari Vasanti)

Soundtrack 
The music was composed by G. Devarajan and the lyrics were written by Sumangala, P. Bhaskaran, Vayalar Ramavarma and Bharanikkavu Sivakumar.

References

External links 
 

1970s Malayalam-language films
1973 films
Films directed by A. Vincent